Chali Sophonpanich, is a Thai businessman and the second son of Chatri Sophonpanich, grandson of Chin Sophonpanich. And he serves as the President of Asia Investment. Bangkok Bank is his family business.

References

External links
Chatri Sophonpanich comment on his sons Chartsiri Sophonpanich & Charlie Sophonpanich
Fortune 100 Association
嘉定新城 盤古天地 地產項目
東盟博覽會組委會副主任到訪泰國

Chali Sophonpanich
Living people
Chali Sophonpanich
Year of birth missing (living people)